Pentti Koskela (born 27 November 1945) is a Finnish former ice hockey goaltender and Olympian.

Koskela played with Team Finland at the 1968 Winter Olympics held in Grenoble, France. He previously played for Ilves Tampere in SM-Liiga.

References

1945 births
Living people
Ice hockey players at the 1968 Winter Olympics
Olympic ice hockey players of Finland
Finnish ice hockey goaltenders
Ice hockey people from Tampere